Joinel is a surname. Notable people with the surname include:

Alban Joinel (born 1979), French footballer
Jean-Luc Joinel (born 1953), French rugby union player